Ali  Dashti (pronounced ; 31 March 1897 – January 16, 1982) was an Iranian writer and politician of the twentieth century. Dashti served as a senator in Iran during the Pahlavi dynasty.

Life
Born into a Persian family in Dashti  in  Bushehr Province, Iran on 31 March 1897. Ali Dashti received a traditional religious education. He studied Islamic theology, history, Arabic and Persian grammar, and classical literature in madrasas in Karbala and Najaf (both in Iraq). He returned to Iran in 1918 and lived in Shiraz, Isfahan, and finally in Tehran, where he became involved in politics of the day.

Rather than becoming a scholar, he became a journalist and published a newspaper (Shafaq-e Sorkh) in Tehran from 1922 to 1935. He was a member of Majlis at various times between 1928 and 1946.

His criticism of allowing the Tudeh party into the cabinet and concessions to the Soviets landed him in prison in 1946. He was appointed a Senator in 1954 until the Islamic revolution in 1979.

In 1975, he gave the papers for his book Bist O Seh Sal (Twenty Three Years) to professor of Persian and Arabic Frank RC Bagley and asked him to translate it, but not to publish it until after his death.  He reiterated this request in 1977 and 1978.  Frank RC Bagley kept his promise and, having translated and organised Ali Dashti's papers into a publishable format, the book was printed in 1985.  

An Iranian newspaper reported Ali Dashti's death in the month of Dey of the Iranian year 1360, i.e. between 22 December 1981 and 20 January 1982.

Writing 
In the book 23 Years: A Study of the Prophetic Career of Mohammad, Dashti chooses reason over blind faith:
 "Belief can blunt human reason and common sense, even in learned scholars. What is needed is more impartial study."

Dashti strongly denied the miracles ascribed to Muhammad by the Islamic tradition and rejected the Muslim view that the Quran is the word of God himself. Instead, he favors thorough and skeptical examination of all orthodox belief systems. Dashti argues that the Quran contains nothing new in the sense of ideas not already expressed by others. All the moral precepts of the Quran are self-evident and generally acknowledged.

The stories in it are taken in identical or slightly modified forms from the lore of the Jews and the Christians, whose rabbis and monks Muhammad had met and consulted on his journeys to Syria, and from memories conserved by the descendants of the peoples of Ad and Thamud.

Muhammad reiterated principles which mankind had already conceived in earlier centuries and many places.
 "Confucius, Buddha, Zoroaster, Socrates, Moses, and Jesus had said similar things. Many of the duties and rites of Islam are continuous practices which the pagan Arabs had adopted from the Jews."

Bibliography 
 Dashti on Persian Classics:

Naqshi az Hafez (1936), on the poet Hafez (ca. 1319-1390).

Seyr-i dar Divan-e Shams, on the lyric verse of the poet Mowlavi Jalal od-Din Rumi (1207–1273).this book has been translated by Sayeh Dashti, Ph.D from Persian to English in 2003.

Dar Qalamrow-e Sa'di, on the poet and prose-writer Sa'di (1208?-1292).

Sha'eri dir-ashna (1961), on Khaqani (1121/22-1190), a particularly difficult but interesting poet.

Dami ba Khayyam (1965), on the quatrain-writer and mathematician Omar Khayyam (1048?-1131); translated by Laurence P. Elwell Sutton, In Search of Omar Khayyam, London 1971.

Negah-i be Sa'eb (1974), on the poet Sa'eb (1601–1677).

Kakh-e ebda', andisheha-ye gunagun-e Hafez, on various ideas expressed by Hafez

 On Ethics, Theology and Philosophy:

Parda-ye pendar (1974 and twice reprinted), on Sufism (Iranian-Islamic mysticism).

Jabr ya ekhtiyar (anonymous and undated, contents first published in the periodical Vahid in 1971), dialogues with a Sufi about predestination and free will.

Takht-e Pulad (anonymous and undated, contents first published in the periodical Khaterat in 1971-72), dialogues in the historic Takht-e Pulad cemetery of Esfahan with a learned 'alem who sticks to the letter of the Qur'an and the Hadith.

Oqala bar khelaf-e 'aql (1975 and twice reprinted, revised versions of articles first published in the periodicals Yaghma in 1972 and 1973, Vahid in 1973, and Rahnoma-ye Ketab in 1973, with two additional articles), on logical contradictions in arguments used by theologians, particularly Mohammad ol-Ghazzali (1058–1111).

Dar diyar-e Sufiyan (1975), on Sufism, a continuation of Parda-ye pendar.

Bist o Se Sal بيست و سه سال [Roman transliteration of and Persian for "twenty-three years"] 
23 Years, a study of the prophetic career of Mohammad.

 Novels:

Ali Dashti sympathized with the desire of educated Iranian women for freedom to use their brains and express their personalities; but he does not present a very favourable picture of them in his collections of novelettes:
Fetna (1943 and 1949), Jadu (1951) and Hendu (1955). His heroines engage in flirtations and intrigues with no apparent motive except cold calculation. Nevertheless, these stories are very readable, and they provide a vivid, and no doubt partly accurate, record of the social life of the upper classes and the psychological problems of the educated women in Tehran at the time.

Newspapers:
He succeeded in establishing his own newspaper at Tehran, Shafaq-e Sorkh (Red Dawn), which lasted from 1 March 1922 until 18 March 1935. He was its editor until 1 March 1931, when Ma'el Tuyserkani took over.

Political Works Collected Articles:

Ayyam-e Mahbas (Prison Days) (1922) 

Panjah o Panj (Fifty Five) on major and influential political personalities of Iran

Translations into Persian:

Edmond Demolins's A quoi tient La superiorite des Anglo-Saxons
Samuel Smiles's Self-Help translated into Persian from Arabic

Criticism
Criticism on Ali Dashti dates back to the 1940s when Gholamhossein Mosaheb, founder of The Persian Encyclopedia, wrote a book named Ali Dashti's plots. Mosahab has another note on Dashti which he published as an anonymous author in the Shafagh newspaper around the same time.

Supporting Reza Pahlavi
According to Mossahab, "ever since Reza Pahlavi assumed head of the defense ministry and violated the constitution, Dashti supported him". He indicates Dashti's article in a newspaper back in 1930 where Dashti addresses Reza Pahlavi as a "national symbol". Dashti's alleged role in Reza Pahlavi's assumption of power was so large that the famous poet Mohammad-Taqi Bahar mentions his name in his political poem, "Jomhoori Nameh"(The republic letter).

Spying for the British
In the fifth Iranian national assembly, Hassan Modarres presented documents showing Dashti's relations with the British government and the mutual support by the British to help him become a congressman. The documents were published in the "Siasat" newspaper at that time in which the British ambassador was ordering some to financially support Dashti in return for his service. As a result, Dashti's petition to enter the congress was denied by the majority of congressmen.

The book "55"
In 1977, Dashti wrote a book titled "The 55", a sympathetic account of the 55 years of the Pahlavi family's reign. The council of Tehran University nominated Dashti for an honorary Doctoral degree. The reviews were polarized. One of his harsher critics, Ehsan Tabari, wrote:
In Iran's contemporary history, there are and have been men like, Taghi-zadeh, Doctor Rezazadeh Shafagh and the very Mr. Ali Dashti, who spent all they ever owned serving the tyrants in return for their personal benefits; or as the poet says "They have enslaved knowledge, freedom, faith and fairness"; or, as in the proverb taken from the Gospel teachings, "spared the pearl for the pigs".
When the Iranian revolution occurred two years later, Dashti published a book named "The Fall Factors", a critical analysis of the Pahlavi dynasty exploring the reasons behind its downfall.

References and notes

Iranian writers
Iranian literary critics
Members of the Senate of Iran
Iranian Iranologists
People from Bushehr Province
1890s births
1982 deaths
Members of the 14th Iranian Majlis
Iranian former Shia Muslims